Violet Sizani Siwela is a South African politician who has been the Chairperson of the Portfolio Committee on Small Business Development in the National Assembly of South Africa since 2019. A member of the African National Congress, she has been an MP since 2019.

Siwela formerly served as a member of the Mpumalanga Provincial Legislature and as a Member of the Executive Council (MEC) in the provincial government. In 2009 she was elected as the deputy speaker of the provincial legislature. Siwela became the MEC for Agriculture in 2011. In 2014, she was appointed as the MEC for Human Settlement, a position she held until her removal from the executive council in a reshuffle done by premier David Mabuza in August 2016. In March 2018, she was elected as the speaker of the provincial legislature. Siwela was elected to Parliament in 2019.

References

External links

Profile at Parliament of South Africa

Living people
Year of birth missing (living people)
Place of birth missing (living people)
Swazi people
Women members of provincial legislatures of South Africa
Members of the Mpumalanga Provincial Legislature
Women members of the National Assembly of South Africa
Members of the National Assembly of South Africa
African National Congress politicians